Laura Johnson is an American actress. She is best known for playing Terry Hartford in the CBS primetime soap opera Falcon Crest from 1983 to 1986.

Career
Johnson made her film debut in the 1977 drama film Opening Night directed by John Cassavetes and starring Gena Rowlands. From 1979 to 1980, she had a recurring role as Betty Lou Barker in the CBS prime time soap opera Dallas. In 1983, she was cast as Terry Hartford in the another CBS prime time soap opera, Falcon Crest  playing this role to 1986. In 1986, she received a Soap Opera Digest Award nomination for Outstanding Villainess on a Prime Time Serial. 

Johnson appeared in a number of movies, include Beyond Reason (1985), Wes Craven's Chiller (1985), Fatal Instinct (1992), Trauma (1993), Deadly Exposure (1993), Four Christmases (2008) and Fame (2009). From 1988 to 1989, she played one of leads in the ABC medical drama series Heartbeat produced by Aaron Spelling. From 1998 to 1999, she played a leading role in the syndicated television family drama Born Free. Johnson also guest starred in a number of shows, include Hotel, L.A. Law, In the Heat of the Night, Nash Bridges, Strong Medicine and Monk.

Personal life
Johnson was born in Burbank, California. She was first married to producer David Solomon, and then to actor Harry Hamlin from 1985 to 1990.

Filmography 

Opening Night (1977) as Nancy Stein
Beyond Reason (1977) as Leslie Valentine 
Dallas as Betty Lou (3 episodes, 1979-1980) 
Fly Away Home (1981) as Chickie
Hotel as Natasha Cellini (1 episode, 1985) 
Wes Craven's Chiller (1985) as Leigh Kenyon (TV movie)
Falcon Crest as Terry Hartford Ranson Channing (80 episodes, 1983–1986) 
L.A. Law as Nina Hollender (2 episodes, 1987) 
Red River (1988) as Kate
Heartbeat as Dr. Eve Autrey (18 episodes, 1988–1989)
Nick Knight (1989) as Dr. Alyce Hunter  
Jake and the Fatman as Ms. Amelie Saint-John (episode "More than you know", 1990)
Murderous Vision (1991) as Elizabeth
Red Shoe Diaries (1992) episode "Double Dare"
Fatal Instinct (1992) as Catherine Merrims 
Trauma (1993) as Grace Harrington 
Paper Hearts (1993) as Patsy 
Deadly Exposure (1993) as Rita Sullivan
 (1993) as Wendy Hill
Marked for Murder (1993) as Dr. Jean Horton
Awake to Danger (1995) as Renee McAdams 
Judge and Jury (1996) as Grace Silvano
Mr. Atlas (1997) as Teddie Nielsen 
Born Free as Kate McQueen (25 episodes, 1998–1999) 
And the Beat Goes On (1999) as Georgia LaPierre
California Myth (1999) as Angie
Nash Bridges as Simon/Darlene Peck (1 episode, 2000) 
Hope Ranch (2002) as Sam Brooks
Strong Medicine as Claudia Chase (1 episode, 2002) 
JAG as Mrs. Kubin (1 episode, 2003) 
The Long Shot (2004) as Bonnie McCloud
The Hollywood Mom's Mystery (2004) as Francine Palumbo
Red Eye (2005) as Blonde Woman 
Cold Case as Rita Hart (1 episode, 2006) 
Without a Trace as Kim Wolfe (1 episode, 2006) 
Four Christmases (2008) as Cheryl 
Fame (2009) as Mrs. Ellerton
The Storm as Anne Cambridge (1 episode, 2009) 
Monk as Carolyn Buxton (1 episode, 2009) 
Mental as Georgia Riede (1 episode, 2009)

References

External links

Actresses from Burbank, California
American soap opera actresses
American television actresses
Living people
American film actresses
20th-century American actresses
21st-century American actresses
Year of birth missing (living people)